The Crow Creek Indian Reservation, home to Crow Creek Sioux Tribe is located in parts of Buffalo, Hughes, and Hyde counties on the east bank of the Missouri River in central South Dakota in the United States. The major town and capital of the federally recognized Crow Creek Sioux Tribe is Fort Thompson.

The town is located adjacent to the Big Bend Dam, which holds back Big Bend Reservoir (also known as Lake Sharpe), one of the four Missouri Mainstem reservoirs constructed by the US Army Corps of Engineers in the Pick-Sloan Plan. Authorized in 1944 for flood control and hydropower, the dam and lake were completed in the 1960s.

History
The people of the Crow Creek Sioux Tribe are mostly descendants of the Mdewakanton Dakota Tribe of south and central present-day Minnesota. They were expelled from Minnesota after all reservations in that state were abolished in December 1862 following the Dakota War. 

The land was poorly suited for people accustomed to their former woodland terrain, as it was dry and lacked game for hunting. For six weeks after their arrival at Crow Creek, three or four Mdewakanton people died every day from starvation or disease.

Some Yankton and lower Yanktonai Dakota also reside on the reservation. Although some writers consider this to have been part of the Great Sioux Reservation, which was established west of the Missouri River, the Crow Creek Reservation, founded in 1862, has always been separate.

The reservation originally included bottomlands along the Missouri, which had been farmed previously by Mandan and Arikara, and other indigenous peoples prior to these tribes. These peoples were decimated in smallpox and other infectious disease epidemics in the 18th century. Surviving Mandan, Hidatsa and Arikara moved northwest and formed the Affiliated Tribes, whose descendants have occupied the Fort Berthold Indian Reservation in North Dakota. Today several former Mandan and Arikara villages within the Crow Creek Reservation are preserved as archaeological sites.

Earlier cultures
Within the reservation are two pre-contact archeological sites that have been designated as National Historic Landmarks. Fort Thompson Mounds is an archeological site consisting of six miles of burial mounds along the river, constructed from c. 800 CE. They have yielded evidence of some of the first pottery makers on the plains. During salvage excavation of one site, some older materials were radiocarbon dated to c. 2450 BCE, showing nearly 5,000 years of indigenous settlement.

The Crow Creek Massacre Site has revealed evidence of fierce conflict between Native American cultures about 1325 CE, likely when they were competing for resources at a time of climate and habitat change. They are believed to have been Siouan-speaking and Caddoan-speaking indigenous peoples who were ancestral to known historic tribes.

20th century to present
The 20th-century development of Lake Sharpe following completion of the Big Bend Dam flooded much of this bottomland. It also forced relocation of Fort Thompson and other settlements. Loss of the most productive, fertile bottomlands worsened the economic conditions for the Mdewakanton and other Native Americans. Allotment and land sales since the late nineteenth century had reduced the amount of land in both tribal and Indian ownership, and the size of the Reservation was reduced by governmental action between its establishment in 1862 and modern times.

The reservation and the Crow Creek Sioux Tribe is organized into three districts. The tribe leases most of its land for grazing to a few large ranching families, as it is not suitable for subsistence farming. Unemployment is high.

The tribe operates the Lode Star Casino and Hotel on its reservation, attracting tourists and area residents. The archeological sites are also featured for heritage tourism. Recreational travelers use Lake Sharpe's fishing and boating. 

The Lower Brule Indian Reservation, originally part of the Great Sioux Reservation, is located on the west bank of the Missouri River. It is directly across from the Crow Creek Reservation. Its people also lost fertile bottomlands in the flooding that accompanied the construction of the dam.

Legacy
In 2002 a monument was dedicated at Big Bend Dam. The Spirit of the Circle Monument honors the more than 1,300 people who died of malnutrition and exposure over a three-year period in the 1860s at the reservation after the Santee Dakota had been expelled from Minnesota.  Deaths in early years at Crow Creek included many members of the Ho-Chunk nation, who had also been forced to relocate to Crow Creek by an act of Congress -- even though they were uninvolved in the Dakota War of 1862.   

On May 10, 2013, about 150 years after Minnesota's Territorial Governor Alexander Ramsey had called for the extermination or removal of the Dakota people from Minnesota, his modern-day successor Mark Dayton observed a "day of reconciliation".  He repudiated his predecessor's encouragement of vigilante violence against innocent people, and offered condolences to descendants who had lost ancestors in the Dakota War of 1862.

Tribal information
 Reservation: Crow Creek Reservation; Buffalo, Hyde, and Hughes counties
 Division: Santee, Yankton
 Bands: Mdewakanton (People of Spirit Lake), Ihanktonwan (People of the End)
 Land Area: 
 Tribal Headquarters: Fort Thompson, SD
 Time Zone: Central
 Traditional Language: Dakota
 Enrolled members living on reservation: 1,230
 Major industry: Agriculture

Government
 Charter: None; Constitution and Bylaws: Yes
 Date Approved: April 26, 1949
 Name of Governing Body: Crow Creek Sioux Tribal Council
 Number of members: six (6) council members
 Dates of Constitutional amendments: February 25, 1963, June 23, 1980, February 4, 1986
 Number of Executive Officers: (1) Chairman

Elections
 Election of all six council members and the Chair are held every two years on the third Tuesday in April. The Chairman is elected at-large by all districts. Council members are elected two each from three districts. The Tribal Council elects from within a Vice-Chairman, Treasurer and Secretary.

Council meetings
 Regular meetings are held once a month.
 Quorum number: 4 members

Notable tribal members
 Oscar Howe (1915–1983), Yanktonai, modernist painter. Howe was born and grew up on the Crow Creek Reservation. He received many honors, including being chosen as Artist Laureate of South Dakota. More than 20 Oscar Howe originals are on display at the Oscar Howe Art Center in Mitchell, South Dakota. One of his works was adapted as a tapestry that hangs behind the altar at the chapel at St. Joseph's Indian School in Chamberlain, South Dakota.
 Elizabeth Cook-Lynn taught Native American Studies for 20 years before becoming a full-time writer. She is the author of two novels and a collection of short stories. She edits the Wicazo Sa (Red Pencil) Review, an international Native American studies journal. She is also a traditional dancer on the powwow circuit. Cook-Lynn grew up on the Crow Creek Reservation.
 Shawn Hawk, world-rated professional boxer, has some roots at Crow Creek.
 Vernon Ashley was the oldest member of the Crow Creek Sioux Tribe at his death at age 99 in November 2015; he had been inducted into the South Dakota Hall of Fame in 1991. He had extensive knowledge of Native American laws and treaties, as well as the Dakota Sioux language. Ashley helped in developing the 1948 constitution and by-laws (red book), which the Crow Creek Sioux Tribe has used since it established elected government. In his state position, he worked on leadership and training for tribal councils.

See also 
 Crow Creek massacre

Notes

References
Environmental Assessment, Crow Creek Tribal School, Nathan A. Barton, Wasteline, Inc. 2004.
Crow Creek Reservation, South Dakota United States Census Bureau

External links

Crow Creek Reservation, official website
"Crow Creek: Stolen Lands, Wind Farms and Taking a Stand for the People", NDN News, 19 December 2009
Crow Creek Sioux Tribe Infrastructure Development Trust Fund Act of 1996

Archaeological sites in South Dakota
Federally recognized tribes in the United States
Geography of Buffalo County, South Dakota
Geography of Hughes County, South Dakota
Geography of Hyde County, South Dakota
Dakota War of 1862
American Indian reservations in South Dakota
Santee Dakota